The Charisma Myth is a 2012 non-fiction book by Olivia Fox Cabane. It shares what the author believes are the main components of charisma: presence, power, and warmth.

References

2012 non-fiction books
American non-fiction books
Portfolio (publisher) books